Bobby Riggs and Alice Marble were the defending champions, but were ineligible to compete after turning professional.

Tom Brown and Louise Brough defeated Geoff Brown and Dorothy Bundy in the final, 6–4, 6–4 to win the mixed doubles tennis title at the 1946 Wimbledon Championships.

Seeds

  Harry Hopman /  Margaret Osborne (semifinals)
  Geoff Brown /  Dorothy Bundy (final)
  Tom Brown /  Louise Brough (champions)
  Dinny Pails /  Kay Menzies (quarterfinals)

Draw

Finals

Top half

Section 1

Section 2

Section 3

Section 4

Bottom half

Section 5

Section 6

Section 7

Section 8

References

External links

X=Mixed Doubles
Wimbledon Championship by year – Mixed doubles